Free content, libre content, libre information, or free information, is any kind of functional work, work of art, or other creative content that meets the definition of a free cultural work.

Definition 
A free cultural work is, according to the definition of Free Cultural Works, one that has no significant legal restriction on people's freedom to:

 use the content and benefit from using it,
 study the content and apply what is learned,
 make and distribute copies of the content,
 change and improve the content and distribute these derivative works.

Free content encompasses all works in the public domain and also those copyrighted works whose licenses honor and uphold the freedoms mentioned above. Because the Berne Convention in most countries by default grants copyright holders monopolistic control over their creations, copyright content must be explicitly declared free, usually by the referencing or inclusion of licensing statements from within the work.

Although there are a great many different definitions in regular everyday use, free content is legally very similar, if not like an identical twin, to open content. An analogy is a use of the rival terms free software and open-source, which describe ideological differences rather than legal ones. For instance, the Open Knowledge Foundation's Open Definition describes "open" as synonymous to the definition of free in the "Definition of Free Cultural Works" (as also in the Open Source Definition and Free Software Definition). For such free/open content both movements recommend the same three Creative Commons licenses, the CC BY, CC BY-SA, and CC0.

Legal matters

Copyright

Copyright is a legal concept, which gives the author or creator of a work legal control over the duplication and public performance of their work. In many jurisdictions, this is limited by a time period after which the works then enter the public domain. Copyright laws are a balance between the rights of creators of intellectual and artistic works and the rights of others to build upon those works. During the time period of copyright the author's work may only be copied, modified, or publicly performed with the consent of the author, unless the use is a fair use. Traditional copyright control limits the use of the work of the author to those who either pay royalties to the author for usage of the author's content or limit their use to fair use. Secondly, it limits the use of content whose author cannot be found. Finally, it creates a perceived barrier between authors by limiting derivative works, such as mashups and collaborative content.

Public domain 

The public domain is a range of creative works whose copyright has expired or was never established, as well as ideas and facts which are ineligible for copyright. A public domain work is a work whose author has either relinquished to the public or no longer can claim control over, the distribution and usage of the work. As such, any person may manipulate, distribute, or otherwise use the work, without legal ramifications. A work in the public domain or released under a permissive license may be referred to as "copycenter".

Copyleft

Copyleft is a play on the word copyright and describes the practice of using copyright law to remove restrictions on distributing copies and modified versions of a work. The aim of copyleft is to use the legal framework of copyright to enable non-author parties to be able to reuse and, in many licensing schemes, modify content that is created by an author. Unlike works in the public domain, the author still maintains copyright over the material, however, the author has granted a non-exclusive license to any person to distribute, and often modify, the work. Copyleft licenses require that any derivative works be distributed under the same terms and that the original copyright notices be maintained. A symbol commonly associated with copyleft is a reversal of the copyright symbol, facing the other way; the opening of the C points left rather than right. Unlike the copyright symbol, the copyleft symbol does not have a codified meaning.

Usage
Projects that provide free content exist in several areas of interest, such as software, academic literature, general literature, music, images, video, and engineering. Technology has reduced the cost of publication and reduced the entry barrier sufficiently to allow for the production of widely disseminated materials by individuals or small groups. Projects to provide free literature and multimedia content have become increasingly prominent owing to the ease of dissemination of materials that are associated with the development of computer technology. Such dissemination may have been too costly prior to these technological developments.

Media

In media, which includes textual, audio, and visual content, free licensing schemes such as some of the licenses made by Creative Commons have allowed for the dissemination of works under a clear set of legal permissions. Not all Creative Commons licenses are entirely free; their permissions may range from very liberal general redistribution and modification of the work to a more restrictive redistribution-only licensing. Since February 2008, Creative Commons licenses which are entirely free carry a badge indicating that they are "approved for free cultural works". Repositories exist which exclusively feature free material and provide content such as photographs, clip art, music, and literature. While extensive reuse of free content from one website in another website is legal, it is usually not sensible because of the duplicate content problem. Wikipedia is amongst the most well-known databases of user-uploaded free content on the web. While the vast majority of content on Wikipedia is free content, some copyrighted material is hosted under fair-use criteria.

Software

Free and open-source software, which is also often referred to as open source software and free software, is a maturing technology with major companies using free software to provide both services and technology to both end-users and technical consumers. The ease of dissemination has allowed for increased modularity, which allows for smaller groups to contribute to projects as well as simplifying collaboration. Open source development models have been classified as having a similar peer-recognition and collaborative benefit incentives that are typified by more classical fields such as scientific research, with the social structures that result from this incentive model decreasing production cost. Given sufficient interest in a software component, by using peer-to-peer distribution methods, distribution costs of software may be reduced, removing the burden of infrastructure maintenance from developers. As distribution resources are simultaneously provided by consumers, these software distribution models are scalable, that is the method is feasible regardless of the number of consumers. In some cases, free software vendors may use peer-to-peer technology as a method of dissemination. In general, project hosting and code distribution is not a problem for the most of free projects as a number of providers offer them these services free.

Engineering and technology

Free content principles have been translated into fields such as engineering, where designs and engineering knowledge can be readily shared and duplicated, in order to reduce overheads associated with project development. Open design principles can be applied in engineering and technological applications, with projects in mobile telephony, small-scale manufacture, the automotive industry, and even agricultural areas. Technologies such as distributed manufacturing can allow computer-aided manufacturing and computer-aided design techniques to be able to develop small-scale production of components for the development of new, or repair of existing, devices. Rapid fabrication technologies underpin these developments, which allow end-users of technology to be able to construct devices from pre-existing blueprints, using software and manufacturing hardware to convert information into physical objects.

Academia 

In academic work, the majority of works are not free, although the percentage of works that are open access is growing rapidly. Open access refers to online research outputs that are free of all restrictions on access (e.g. access tolls) and free of many restrictions on use (e.g. certain copyright and license restrictions). Authors may see open access publishing as a method of expanding the audience that is able to access their work to allow for greater impact of the publication, or may support it for ideological reasons. Open access publishers such as PLOS and BioMed Central provide capacity for review and publishing of free works; though such publications are currently more common in science than humanities. Various funding institutions and governing research bodies have mandated that academics must produce their works to be open-access, in order to qualify for funding, such as the US National Institutes of Health, Research Councils UK (effective 2016) and the European Union (effective 2020). At an institutional level some universities, such as the Massachusetts Institute of Technology, have adopted open access publishing by default by introducing their own mandates. Some mandates may permit delayed publication and may charge researchers for open access publishing.

Open content publication has been seen as a method of reducing costs associated with information retrieval in research, as universities typically pay to subscribe for access to content that is published through traditional means whilst improving journal quality by discouraging the submission of research articles of reduced quality. Subscriptions for non-free content journals may be expensive for universities to purchase, though the article are written and peer-reviewed by academics themselves at no cost to the publisher. This has led to disputes between publishers and some universities over subscription costs, such as the one which occurred between the University of California and the Nature Publishing Group. For teaching purposes, some universities, including , provide freely available course content, such as lecture notes, video resources and tutorials. This content is distributed via Internet resources to the general public. Publication of such resources may be either by a formal institution-wide program, or alternately via informal content provided by individual academics or departments.

Legislation
Any country has its own law and legal system, sustained by its legislation, a set of law-documents—documents containing statutory obligation rules, usually law and created by legislatures. In a democratic country, each law-document is published as open media content, is in principle free content; but in general, there are no explicit licenses attributed for each law-document, so the license must be interpreted, an implied license. Only a few countries have explicit licenses in their law-documents, as the UK's Open Government Licence (a  compatible license). In the other countries, the implied license comes from its proper rules (general laws and rules about copyright in government works). The automatic protection provided by Berne Convention not apply to law-documents: Article 2.4 excludes the official texts from the automatic protection. It is also possible to "inherit" the license from context. The set of country's law-documents is made available through national repositories. Examples of law-document open repositories: LexML Brazil, Legislation.gov.uk, N-Lex. In general, a law-document is offered in more than one (open) official version, but the main one is that published by a government gazette. So, law-documents can eventually inherit license expressed by the repository or by the gazette that contains it.

Open content

Open content describes any work that others can copy or modify freely by attributing to the original creator, but without needing to ask for permission. This has been applied to a range of formats, including textbooks, academic journals, films and music. The term was an expansion of the related concept of open-source software. Such content is said to be under an open license.

History 
The concept of applying free software licenses to content was introduced by Michael Stutz, who in 1997 wrote the paper "Applying Copyleft to Non-Software Information" for the GNU Project. The term "open content" was coined by David A. Wiley in 1998 and evangelized via the Open Content Project, describing works licensed under the Open Content License (a non-free share-alike license, see 'Free content' below) and other works licensed under similar terms.

It has since come to describe a broader class of content without conventional copyright restrictions. The openness of content can be assessed under the '5Rs Framework' based on the extent to which it can be reused, revised, remixed and redistributed by members of the public without violating copyright law. Unlike free content and content under open-source licenses, there is no clear threshold that a work must reach to qualify as 'open content'.

Although open content has been described as a counterbalance to copyright, open content licenses rely on a copyright holder's power to license their work, as copyleft which also utilizes copyright for such a purpose.

In 2003 Wiley announced that the Open Content Project has been succeeded by Creative Commons and their licenses, where he joined as "Director of Educational Licenses".

In 2005, the Open Icecat project was launched, in which product information for e-commerce applications was created and published under the Open Content License. It was embraced by the tech sector, which was already quite open source minded.

In 2006 the Creative Commons' successor project was the Definition of Free Cultural Works for free content, put forth by Erik Möller, Richard Stallman, Lawrence Lessig, Benjamin Mako Hill, Angela Beesley, and others. The Definition of Free Cultural Works is used by the Wikimedia Foundation. In 2008, the Attribution and Attribution-ShareAlike Creative Commons licenses were marked as "Approved for Free Cultural Works" among other licenses.

Another successor project is the Open Knowledge Foundation, founded by Rufus Pollock in Cambridge, in 2004 as a global non-profit network to promote and share open content and data. In 2007 the  gave an Open Knowledge Definition for "content such as music, films, books; data be it scientific, historical, geographic or otherwise; government and other administrative information". In October 2014 with version 2.0 Open Works and Open Licenses were defined and "open" is described as synonymous to the definitions of open/free in the Open Source Definition, the Free Software Definition and the Definition of Free Cultural Works. A distinct difference is the focus given to the public domain and that it focuses also on the accessibility (open access) and the readability (open formats).

"Open content" definition 
The website of the Open Content Project once defined open content as 'freely available for modification, use and redistribution under a license similar to those used by the open-source / free software community'. However, such a definition would exclude the Open Content License because that license forbids charging for content; a right required by free and open-source software licenses.

The term since shifted in meaning. Open content is "licensed in a manner that provides users with free and perpetual permission to engage in the 5R activities."

The 5Rs are put forward on the Open Content Project website as a framework for assessing the extent to which content is open:

# Retain – the right to make, own, and control copies of the content (e.g., download, duplicate, store, and manage)
 Reuse – the right to use the content in a wide range of ways (e.g., in a class, in a study group, on a website, in a video)
 Revise – the right to adapt, adjust, modify, or alter the content itself (e.g., translate the content into another language)
 Remix – the right to combine the original or revised content with other open content to create something new (e.g., incorporate the content into a mashup)
 Redistribute – the right to share copies of the original content, your revisions, or your remixes with others (e.g., give a copy of the content to a friend)

This broader definition distinguishes open content from open-source software, since the latter must be available for commercial use by the public. However, it is similar to several definitions for open educational resources, which include resources under noncommercial and verbatim licenses.

The later Open Definition by the Open Knowledge Foundation define open knowledge with open content and open data as sub-elements and draws heavily on the Open Source Definition; it preserves the limited sense of open content as free content, unifying both.

Open access

"Open access" refers to toll-free or gratis access to content, mainly published originally peer-reviewed scholarly journals. Some open access works are also licensed for reuse and redistribution (libre open access), which would qualify them as open content.

Open content and education

Over the past decade, open content has been used to develop alternative routes towards higher education. Traditional universities are expensive, and their tuition rates are increasing. Open content allows a free way of obtaining higher education that is "focused on collective knowledge and the sharing and reuse of learning and scholarly content." There are multiple projects and organizations that promote learning through open content, including OpenCourseWare, Khan Academy and the Saylor Academy. Some universities, like MIT, Yale, and Tufts are making their courses freely available on the internet.

Textbooks

The textbook industry is one of the educational industries in which open content can make the biggest impact. Traditional textbooks, aside from being expensive, can also be inconvenient and out of date, because of publishers' tendency to constantly print new editions. Open textbooks help to eliminate this problem, because they are online and thus easily updatable. Being openly licensed and online can be helpful to teachers, because it allows the textbook to be modified according to the teacher's unique curriculum. There are multiple organizations promoting the creation of openly licensed textbooks. Some of these organizations and projects include the University of Minnesota's Open Textbook Library, Connexions, OpenStax College, the Saylor Academy, Open Textbook Challenge and Wikibooks.

Licenses
According to the current definition of open content on the OpenContent website, any general, royalty-free copyright license would qualify as an open license because it 'provides users with the right to make more kinds of uses than those normally permitted under the law. These permissions are granted to users free of charge.'

However, the narrower definition used in the Open Definition effectively limits open content to libre content, any free content license, defined by the Definition of Free Cultural Works, would qualify as an open content license. According to this narrower criteria, the following still-maintained licenses qualify:

 Creative Commons licenses (only Creative Commons Attribution, Attribution-Share Alike and Zero)
 Open Publication License (the original license of the Open Content Project, the Open Content License, did not permit for-profit copying of the licensed work and therefore does not qualify)
 Against DRM license
 GNU Free Documentation License (without invariant sections)
 Open Game License (designed for role-playing games by Wizards of the Coast)
 Free Art License

See also

 Digital rights
 Open source
 Free education
 Free software movement
 Freedom of information
 Information wants to be free
 Open publishing
 Open-source hardware
 Project Gutenberg [Knowledge for free – The Emergence of Open Educational Resources]. 2007, .

Explanatory notes

References

Further reading
 
 OECD – Organisation for Economic Co-operation and Development: ''[http://oberon.sourceoecd.org/vl=1280635/cl=16/nw=1/rpsv/ij/oecdthemes/99980029/v2007n3/s1/p1l  Giving Know

External links
 

 
Digital art
Content
Content